Behind Locked Doors is a feature film by Swiss/German director Anka Schmid from 1991. The ensemble-film shows the everyday life of 17 inhabitants of an apartment building in Berlin Kreuzberg.

Plot 
At first glance the seventeen inhabitants of the old apartment building in Berlin Kreuzberg do not seem to have much in common other than their address. But nonetheless, when the old photographer Mr. Kempinski who invites his neighbors to his 80th birthday party, they are all strangely familiar. There is 60 year old Hannelore who dreams about distant countries and who currently shares her apartment with her lovesick niece, there is student Bona from the Ivory Coast who teaches French in the kitchen while his gay roommate enjoys life and love; the two adolescent sisters with their mother who has fallen in love recently, the middle aged married janitors and then there is the young couple whose daughter prefers sitting in the stairwell than going to school.<ref>Behind Locked Doors" summary on Swissfilms</ref>

 Festivals and awards 
With Behind Locked Doors Anka Schmid won the Swiss Nachwuchspreis'' for up and coming film makers, the Film Award of Zurich as well as the 2nd award of the Film Festival Schwerin.

Further festivals 
Chicago International Film Festival, Film Festival Saarbrücken/Max-Ophüls Award, Strasbourg European Fantastic Film Festival, Bergamo Film Meeting, Warsaw International Film Festival, Créteil International Women's Film Festival

References

External links 
 
  (in German)

1991 films
Films set in Berlin
German drama films
1990s German-language films
Swiss drama films
1991 LGBT-related films
LGBT-related drama films
1990s German films